Fairway is a neighborhood in southeast Lexington, Kentucky, United States. Its boundaries are Sherman Avenue to the north, railroad tracks to the north, Richmond Road to the west, and the Idle Hour Golf Course to the south.

Neighborhood statistics
 Area: 
 Population: 677
 Population density: 3,725 people per square mile
 Median household income:  $67,093 (2010)

References

Neighborhoods in Lexington, Kentucky